Do the Twist! with Ray Charles is a 1961 Atlantic Records compilation album of previously released Ray Charles songs. The album spent one year on the Billboard charts and peaked at number 11.

In 1963, the album got a new cover and was renamed The Greatest Ray Charles. Track listing and catalog number (Atlantic 8054) remained the same.

Track listing
All songs written by Ray Charles except as indicated.

Side A
"Tell Me How Do You Feel?" (Mayfield, Charles) – 2:38
"I Got A Woman" – 6:07
"Heartbreaker" (Nugetre) – 2:50
"Tell the Truth" – 3:12

Side B
"What'd I Say" – 6:25
"Talkin' 'bout You" – 4:12
"You Be My Baby" (Pomus, Shuman) – 2:25
"Leave My Woman Alone" – 2:37
"I'm Movin' On" (Snow) – 2:13

References

Ray Charles compilation albums
1961 greatest hits albums
Atlantic Records compilation albums